Coralliozetus micropes, the Scarletfin blenny, is a species of chaenopsid blenny found in coral reefs in the eastern central Pacific ocean. It can reach a maximum length of  TL. This species feeds primarily on zooplankton.

References
 Beebe, W. and J. Tee-Van, 1938 (28 Sept.) Eastern Pacific expeditions of the New York Zoological Society, XV. Seven new marine fishes from Lower California. Zoologica, Scientific Contributions of the New York Zoological Society v. 23 (pt 3, no. 15): 299–312, Pls. 1–3.

micropes
Fish described in 1938
Taxa named by William Beebe
Taxa named by John Tee-Van